Life Begins may refer to:

Life Begins (TV series), a British TV series broadcast on ITV between February 2004 and October 2006
Life Begins (1932 film), a film directed by James Flood and co-directed by Elliott Nugent
Life Begins (2009 film), a Canadian short drama film
A Life Begins, a 2010 Canadian French language drama film

See also